Justin Michael Perillo (born January 5, 1991) is an American football tight end who is currently a free agent. He played college football at Maine and was signed by the Green Bay Packers as an undrafted free agent in 2014.

Professional career

Green Bay Packers
After going undrafted in the 2014 NFL Draft, Perillo signed with the Green Bay Packers on May 12, 2014. On August 30, 2014, he was released by the Packers during final team cuts. Perillo was signed to the Packers' practice squad the following day. He was signed from the practice squad to the active roster on November 15, 2014, where he spent the rest of his rookie season.

For the second straight season, Perillo was released by the Packers during final team cuts on September 5, 2015. On September 7, 2015, he was again signed to the Packers' practice squad. Perillo was signed from the practice squad to the active roster on October 14, 2015. He recorded his first NFL reception, a 21-yard sideline catch from Aaron Rodgers in a Week 6 game against the San Diego Chargers. Perillo had a breakout game against the Detroit Lions in Week 10, where he hauled in five receptions for 58 yards and scored his first NFL touchdown late in the fourth quarter.

On November 19, 2016, Perillo was released by the Packers.

Chicago Bears
On November 29, 2016, Perillo was signed to the Bears' practice squad. He re-signed with the team on February 10, 2017. On May 1, 2017, Perillo was waived by the Bears.

Statistics
Source: NFL.com

References

External links
 Green Bay Packers bio
 Maine Black Bears bio
 

1991 births
Living people
Players of American football from Wilmington, Delaware
American football tight ends
Maine Black Bears football players
Green Bay Packers players
Chicago Bears players